1959 Academy Awards may refer to:

 31st Academy Awards, the Academy Awards ceremony that took place in 1959
 32nd Academy Awards, the 1960 ceremony honoring the best in film for 1959